The Star (London) may refer to:

 The Star (1788), a London evening newspaper which ran from 1788 to 1831
 The Star (1888), a London evening newspaper which ran from 1888 to 1960